This is a list of Jordan women's international footballers who have played for the Jordan women's national football team.

Players

See also 
 Jordan women's national football team

References 

 
International footballers
International footballers
Jordan
Football in Jordan
Association football player non-biographical articles